Klyavlino is the name of several rural localities in Klyavlinsky District of Samara Oblast, Russia:
 Klyavlino (railway station), a railway station classified as a rural locality
 Klyavlino (selo), a selo